The United States Virgin Islands competed at the 2012 Summer Olympics in London, from July 27 to August 12, 2012. This was the nation's eleventh appearance at the Olympics, except the 1980 Summer Olympics in Moscow, because of the United States boycott.

The Virgin Islands Olympic Committee sent a total of 7 athletes to the Games, 4 men and 3 women, to compete in three different sports, tying the record (two athletes and sports less for each) set by Beijing. Two athletes from the Virgin Islands had competed in Beijing, including sprinter and three-time Olympic athlete LaVerne Jones-Ferrette. Track runner and Olympic semi-finalist Tabarie Henry was the nation's flag bearer at the opening ceremony.

Virgin Islands, however, failed to win its first Olympic medal since the 1988 Summer Olympics in Seoul, where sailor Peter Holmberg won the silver for Finn class. Jones-Ferrette, who considered as the nation's medal prospect, nearly missed out of the final rounds in her respective sporting events.

Athletics

Athletes from the Virgin Islands have so far achieved qualifying standards in the following athletics events (up to a maximum of 3 athletes in each event at the 'A' Standard, and 1 at the 'B' Standard):

Key
 Note – Ranks given for track events are within the athlete's heat only
 Q = Qualified for the next round
 q = Qualified for the next round as a fastest loser or, in field events, by position without achieving the qualifying target
 NR = National record
 N/A = Round not applicable for the event
 Bye = Athlete not required to compete in round

Men
Track & road events

Field events

Women
Track & road events

Sailing

Men

Women

M = Medal race; EL = Eliminated – did not advance into the medal race;

Swimming

Men

See also
 Virgin Islands at the 2012 Summer Paralympics
 Virgin Islands at the 2011 Pan American Games

References

External links
 

Nations at the 2012 Summer Olympics
2012
Summer Olympics